Adger Armstrong Jr. (born June 21, 1957) is a former American football fullback in the National Football League. He was signed by the Houston Oilers as an undrafted free agent in 1980. He played college football at Texas A&M.

Armstrong also played for the Tampa Bay Buccaneers.

External links
Tampa Bay Buccaneers bio

1957 births
Living people
African-American players of American football
American football fullbacks
Texas A&M Aggies football players
Houston Oilers players
Tampa Bay Buccaneers players
Players of American football from Houston
21st-century African-American people
20th-century African-American sportspeople